These Small Glories was a collection of short stories by Australian author Jon Cleary which was published in 1946. They were set during World War II, during which Cleary had served in the Australian army.

Selected Stories 
"A Long Time Dying"
"Good-bye, My Darling"
"Miss England"
"Journey for Revenge"
"You Gotta be Modest"
"Reunion"
"Homecoming"
"The Magnificent Czech"
"The Convert"
"Debut"

Background
In 1940 Cleary joined the A.I.F. and served in the Middle East. While in the Middle East he began writing a series of short stories, founded mostly on fact, which were published in Australian magazines. His short stories were accepted' in American magazines like "The Cosmopolitan" and "The Saturday Evening Post." He later joined the Army Military History Unit and served in New Guinea, where he wrote his first novel You Can't See Round Corners.

Reception
The Age book reviewer said since Cleary "finds the love between some of the men and women as fine as the self sacrifice of others, and has so much craftsmanship that he is able to give dramatic glory to stories that might have been harrowing, he will bring to his readers realisation of what the people of the fighting services have done."

The Advertiser said "Mr. Cleary's writing is spare and polished; he shows himself a really good craftsman."

The Newcastle Herald said "Cleary's prose is economical and rhythmical-crisp, at times, without becoming staccato. He has an eye for colour and detail."

The Sydney Morning Herald said "Like so many books which reach a reviewer these days, the praises of the dust jacket far outstrip the qualities of the stories" but said "Cleary's tales are pleasantly easy to read. He is not yet a Dal Stivens or a Cecil Mann; but then again he has written better stories than those presented here. He has a flair for characterisation."

The Bulletin said "Essentially   both   readable   and   likeable,  with   humor,   color   and   a   true   appreciation   of   the   heroic,   Mr.   Cleary is   spoiling   his   writing   by   a   succession   of   tiny   lapses   enfeebling   the impact   of   the   whole."

References

Australian short story collections
1946 short story collections
Angus & Robertson books